McEvoy Lake is a lake located in Yukon, Canada.

References 

Lakes of Yukon